Colin Malcolm Harburn (3 September 1938 – 12 January 2022) was an Australian cricketer. He played seven first-class matches for Western Australia between 1961/62 and 1964/65. His highest score was 139 against an Australian XI at the WACA Ground in April 1964.

References

External links
 

1938 births
2022 deaths
Australian cricketers
Western Australia cricketers
Cricketers from Perth, Western Australia